Iron Canyon Dam (National ID # CA00417) is a dam in Shasta County, California.

The earthen rockfill dam was constructed in 1965 by the Pacific Gas and Electric Company for hydroelectric power, with a height of 214 feet and a length of 1038 feet at its crest.  It impounds Iron Canyon Creek.  The dam is owned and operated by PG&E.  The downstream James Black Powerhouse, one of the largest in the company's system, produces 270 megawatts of power.

Iron Canyon Reservoir 
The reservoir the dam creates, Iron Canyon Reservoir, is surrounded by the Shasta-Trinity National Forest.  It has a water surface of 510 acres, a shoreline of approximately 15 linear miles, and has a capacity of 24,300 acre-feet.  Recreation includes fishing (for trout), hunting, camping,p and hiking.

Water is diverted from the McCloud River at Lake McCloud about 20 miles (32 km) south of Mount Shasta, through a tunnel to Iron Canyon Reservoir, and then through another tunnel to the James B. Black Powerhouse, which outlets into the Pit River on the upper end of Pit Six Reservoir.

See also 

List of dams and reservoirs in California

References 

Dams in California
Pacific Gas and Electric Company dams
Buildings and structures in Shasta County, California
Earth-filled dams
Pit River
Dams completed in 1965
1965 establishments in California